A war song is a musical composition that relates to war.

War song may also refer to:

 "War Song", a 1972 song by Neil Young
 "The War Song", 1984 song by Culture Club
 "A War Song", a poem by C. Flavell Hayward, set to music by Edward Elgar in 1884
 Warsong, a 1991 video game
 "The War Song”, a 1986 song by Tatsuro Yamashita from the album Pocket Music

See also 

 
 
 War (disambiguation), for songs with the title "War"
 Anti-war song
 War Story (disambiguation)